The Moroccan General Labour Union is a Moroccan independent trade union federation founded in 2013, just after the Arab Spring. Its current general secretary Muhammad Fakhr Edin.

History 
For more weight in negotiations with their employer, workers have formed unions. By strikes and negotiating jointly, they got over the years many advances in terms of pay, conditions and working hours, etc.
In fact, capitalist society has evolved in a way that the thinker of communism, Karl Marx, was excluded in the estimates of its "science" of historical materialism: class struggle has not necessarily led to the dictatorship of the proletariat, or the abolition of social classes.

Ideology 
Moroccan syndicates are in crisis for almost twenty years, a crisis that results in a decrease in the number of militants and the growing ineffectiveness of their actions. For that unions are not confined to a consultative role in the negotiations in the coming years, many changes and reforms are needed to they find some legitimacy in the eyes of their members and the general public. These would include a depoliticization of unions and a redefinition of the claims, for the latter are more realistic.

Trade unions in Morocco